Crăciunelu de Jos is a commune located in the eastern part of Alba County, Transylvania, Romania. It has a population of 4,392. It is composed of a single village, Crăciunelu de Jos. It also included four other villages until 2006, when they were split off to form Bucerdea Grânoasă Commune.

The commune is situated on the right bank of the Târnava River, on the western side of the Transylvanian Plateau. There is also a train station that serves Line 300 of the CFR network, which runs from Bucharest to Blaj to Teiuș and then on towards the Hungarian border.

References

Communes in Alba County
Localities in Transylvania